Darva may refer to:
 Darva, Fars (دروائ - Darvā’), a village in Fars Province, Iran
 Darva, Kerman (دروا - Darvā), a village in Kerman Province, Iran
 Darva, Hormozgan (دروا - Darvā), a village in Hormozgan Province, Iran

See also
 Darva Conger